The Italian Wars, also known as the Habsburg–Valois Wars, were a series of conflicts covering the period between 1494 to 1559, fought mostly in the Italian peninsula, but later expanding into Flanders, the Rhineland and the Mediterranean Sea. The primary belligerents were the Valois kings of France, and their Habsburg opponents in the Holy Roman Empire and Spain. They were supported by various Italian states at different stages of the war, with limited involvement from England and the Ottoman Empire.

The Italic League established in 1454 achieved a balance of power in Italy, but fell apart after the death of its chief architect, Lorenzo de' Medici, in 1492. Combined with the ambition of Ludovico Sforza, its collapse allowed Charles VIII of France to invade Naples in 1494, which drew in Spain and the Holy Roman Empire. Despite being forced to withdraw in 1495, Charles showed the Italian states were wealthy, but vulnerable due to political divisions, making parts of Italy a battleground in the struggle for European domination between France and the Habsburgs.

Fought with considerable brutality, the wars took place against the background of religious turmoil caused by the Reformation, particularly in France and the Holy Roman Empire. They are seen as a turning point in the evolution from medieval to modern warfare, with the use of the arquebus or handgun becoming common, along with significant technological improvements in siege artillery. Literate commanders and modern printing methods also make them one of the first conflicts with a significant number of contemporary accounts, including those of Francesco Guicciardini, Niccolò Machiavelli and Blaise de Montluc. 

After 1503, most of the fighting was initiated by French invasions of Lombardy and Piedmont, but although able to hold territory for periods of time, they could not do so permanently. By 1557, both France and the Empire were confronted by internal divisions over religion, while Spain faced a potential revolt in the Spanish Netherlands. The Treaty of Cateau-Cambrésis (1559) largely expelled France from northern Italy, gaining in exchange Calais and the Three Bishoprics; it established Spain as the dominant power in the south, controlling Naples and Sicily, as well as Milan in the north.

Background

Largely driven by the rivalry between the Republic of Venice and Duchy of Milan, the long-running Wars in Lombardy had finally been ended by the 1454 Treaty of Lodi. Followed shortly thereafter by a non-aggression pact known as the Italic League, it led to a forty year period of stability and economic expansion, marred only by the 1479 to 1481 Pazzi conspiracy and 1482 to 1484 War of Ferrara. The League's main supporter was the Florentine ruler Lorenzo de' Medici, who also pursued a policy of excluding France and the Holy Roman Empire from the Italian peninsula.  

Lorenzo's death in April 1492 severely weakened the League at a time when France was seeking to expand in Italy. This originated when Louis XI of France inherited the County of Provence from his cousin Charles IV of Anjou in 1481, along with the Angevin claim to the Kingdom of Naples. His son Charles VIII succeeded him in 1483 and formally incorporated Provence into France in 1486; its ports of Marseilles and Toulon provided direct access to the Mediterranean and thus the ability to pursue his territorial ambitions.

In the run-up to the First Italian War, Charles sought to secure the neutrality of other European rulers through a series of treaties. These included the November 1492 Peace of Étaples with Henry VII of England and the March 1493 Treaty of Barcelona with Maximilian I, Holy Roman Emperor.

Italian War of 1494–1498

The war began when Ludovico Sforza, then Regent of Milan, encouraged Charles VIII of France to invade Italy, using the Angevin claim to the throne of Naples as a pretext. This in turn was driven by the intense rivalry between Ludovico's wife, Beatrice d'Este, and that of his nephew Gian Galeazzo Sforza, son of Isabella of Aragon. Despite being the hereditary Duke of Milan, Gian Galeazzo had been sidelined by his uncle in 1481 and exiled to Pavia. Both women wanted to ensure their children inherited the Duchy and when Isabella's father became Alfonso II of Naples in January 1494, she asked for his help in securing their rights. In September Charles invaded the peninsula, which he justified by claiming he wanted to use Naples as a base for a crusade against the Ottoman Turks. 

In October, Ludovico formally became Duke of Milan following the death of Gian Galeazzo, who was popularly supposed to have been poisoned by his uncle, and the French marched through Italy virtually unopposed, entering Pisa on 8 November, Florence on 17th, and Rome on 31 December. Charles was backed by Girolamo Savonarola, who used the opportunity to established a short-lived theocracy in Florence, while Pope Alexander VI allowed his army free passage through the Papal States. 

In February 1495, the French reached Monte San Giovanni Campano in the Kingdom of Naples and despatched envoys to negotiate terms with its Neapolitan garrison, who murdered them and sent their mutilated bodies back to the French lines. On 9 February, the enraged besiegers breached the walls of the castle with artillery fire, then stormed it, killing everyone inside. Known as the "Sack of Naples", widespread outrage within Italy allied with concern over the power of France led to the formation of the League of Venice on 31 March 1495, an anti-French alliance composed of Republic of Venice, Milan, Spain and the Holy Roman Empire. 

Later joined by Florence, following the overthrow of Savonarola, the Papal States and Mantua, this coalition cut off Charles and his army from their bases in France. Charles' cousin, Louis d'Orleans, now tried to take advantage of Ludovico's change of sides to conquer Milan, which he claimed through his grandmother, Valentina Visconti. On 11 June, he captured Novara when the garrison defected, and reached Vigevano, forty kilometres from Milan. At this crucial point, Ludovico was incapacitated either by a stroke or nervous breakdown, while his unpaid soldiers were on the verge of mutiny. In his absence, his wife Beatrice d'Este took personal control of the Duchy and the siege of Novara, with Louis eventually forced to surrender in return for his freedom. 

Having replaced Ferdinand II of Naples with a pro-French government, Charles turned north and on 6 July was intercepted by the League outside Fornovo di Taro. In the resulting Battle of Fornovo, the French forced their opponents back across the Taro river and continued onto Asti, leaving most of their supplies behind. Both sides claimed victory but the general consensus favoured the French, since the League suffered heavier casualties and failed to halt their retreat, the reason for fighting in the first place. In the south, despite some initial reverses, by September 1495 Ferdinand II had regained control of his kingdom. Although the French invasion achieved little, it showed the Italian states were rich and comparatively weak, making future intervention attractive to outside powers. Charles himself died on 7 April 1498, and was succeeded by the former Duke of Orleans, who became Louis XII.

Italian Wars of 1499–1504

The next phase of the conflict originated in the long-standing rivalry between Florence and the Republic of Pisa, which had been annexed by Florence in 1406 but took advantage of the French invasion to regain its independence in 1494. Despite Charles' retreat in 1495, Pisa continued to receive support from Genoa, Venice and Milan, all of whom were suspicious of Florentine power. In order to strengthen his own position, Ludovico once again invited an external power to settle an internal Italian affair, in this case Emperor Maximilian I. In doing so, Maximilian hoped to bolster the League of Venice, which he viewed as an essential barrier to French intervention, but Florence was convinced he favoured Pisa and refused to accept mediation. To enforce a settlement, in July 1496 Maximilian besieged the Florentine city of Livorno, but withdrew in September due to shortages of men and supplies. 

Following the death of Charles VIII in April 1498, Louis XII began planning another attempt on Milan, while also pursuing his predecessor's claim to the Kingdom of Naples. Aware of the hostility caused by French ambitions in Italy, in July 1498 he renewed the 1492 Peace of Étaples with England and signed a treaty confirming French borders with Burgundy. This was followed in August by the Treaty of Marcoussis with Ferdinand II of Aragon; although it did not address outstanding territorial disputes between the two countries, it agreed  "have all enemies in common except the Pope." On 9 February 1499, Louis signed the Treaty of Blois, a military alliance with Venice against Ludovico. 

With these agreements finalised, a French army of 27,000 under the Milanese exile Gian Giacomo Trivulzio invaded Lombardy, and in August besieged Rocca d'Arazzo, a fortified town in the western part of the Duchy of Milan. The French siege artillery breached the walls in less than five hours and after the town capitulated, Louis ordered the execution of its garrison and senior members of the civil administration. Other Milanese strongholds surrendered rather than face the same fate, while Ludovico, whose wife Beatrice had died in 1497, fled the duchy with his children and took refuge with Maximilian. On 6 October 1499, Louis made a triumphant entry into Milan.

Florence now asked for French assistance in retaking Pisa, a request Louis was in no hurry to fulfil since they had refused to support his capture of Milan. He was also initially occupied in defeating efforts to regain his duchy by Ludovico, who was captured at Novaro in April 1500 and spent the rest of his life in a French prison. However, Louis needed to maintain good relations with Florence, whose territory he would have to cross in order to conquer Naples, and on 29 June 1500 a combined Franco-Florentine army appeared outside Pisa. Once again, the French artillery quickly opened a gap in the walls but several assaults were repulsed and the siege was abandoned on 11 July.

With Milan firmly in his control, Louis returned to France and left the Florentines to blockade Pisa, which eventually surrendered in 1509. Anxious to begin the conquest of Naples, on 11 November he signed the Treaty of Granada with Ferdinand II of Aragon, an agreement to divide the kingdom between the two. Since Ferdinand had supported the expulsion of the French from Naples in 1495, Louis hoped these concessions would allow him to acquire the bulk of the kingdom without an expensive war. His action was criticised by contemporaries like Niccolò Machiavelli and modern historians, who argue the 1499 Treaty of Marcoussis already gave Louis everything he needed, while inviting Spain into Naples could only work to his detriment. 

In July 1501, the French army reached Capua; strongly defended by forces loyal to Frederick of Naples, it surrendered on 24 July after a short siege but was then sacked. In addition to the extensive material destruction, many women were subjected to mass rape and estimates of the dead ranged from 2,000 to 4,000, actions that caused consternation throughout Italy. Resistance crumbled as other towns tried to avoid the same fate and on 12 October Louis appointed the Duke of Nemours his viceroy in Naples. However, the Treaty of Granada had left the ownership of key Neapolitan territories undecided and disputes over these quickly poisoned relationships between the two powers. This led to war in late 1502, which ended with the French being expelled from Naples once again after defeats at Cerignola on 28 April 1503, and Garigliano on 29 December.

War of the League of Cambrai

On 18 October 1503, Pius III was replaced by Pope Julius II, who as ruler of the Papal States was concerned by Venetian power in northern Italy. This fear was shared by his home town of Genoa, which also resented its expulsion from the Po Valley, and Maximilian, whose acquisition of Gorizia in 1500 was threatened by Venetian possession of neighbouring Friuli. Milan, controlled by Louis XII, was a long-standing opponent of Venice, while Ferdinand II, now king of Naples, wished to regain control of Venetian ports on the southern Adriatic coast. Along with the Duchy of Ferrara, Julius united these disparate interests into the anti-Venetian League of Cambrai, signed on 10 December 1508. 

Although the French largely destroyed a Venetian army at Agnadello on 14 May 1509, Maximilian failed to capture Padua and withdrew from Italy. Now seeing the power of Louis XII as the greater threat, in February 1510 Pope Julius made peace with Venice, followed in March by an agreement with the Swiss Cantons to supply him with 6,000 mercenaries. After a year of fighting in which Louis XII occupied large parts of the Papal States, in October 1511 Julius formed the anti-French Holy League, which included Henry VIII of England, Maximilian and Spain.

A French army defeated the Spanish at Ravenna on 11 April 1512, but their leader Gaston de Foix was killed, while the Swiss recaptured Milan and restored Ludovico's son Massimiliano Sforza as duke. The members of the League then fell out over dividing the spoils and the death of Pope Julius on 20 February 1513 left it without effective leadership. In March, Venice and France formed an alliance, but from June to September 1513 the League won victories at Novara and La Motta in Lombardy, Guinegate in Flanders and Flodden in England. Despite this, fighting continued in Italy, with neither side able to gain a decisive advantage.

On 1 January 1515, Louis XII died and was succeeded by his son-in-law, Francis I, who took up his predecessor's cause and routed the Swiss at Marignano on 13-14 September 1515. Combined with the unpopularity of Massiliano Sforza, victory allowed Francis to retake Milan and the Holy League collapsed as both Spain and Pope Leo X saw little benefit in fighting on. In the treaty of Noyon, signed on 13 August 1516, Charles I of Spain acknowledged Francis as Duke of Milan, while Francis "passed" his claim to Naples onto Charles. Left isolated, in December Maximilian signed the Treaty of Brussels, which confirmed French possession of Milan.

Italian War of 1521–1526

Following the death of Maximilian in January 1519, the German Princes elected Charles I of Spain as Emperor Charles V on 28 June. This brought Spain, the Low Countries and the Holy Roman Empire under one ruler, and meant France was surrounded by the so-called "Habsburg ring". Francis I had also been a candidate for the Imperial throne, adding a personal dimension to his rivalry with Charles that became one of the fundamental conflicts of the sixteenth century.

Planning an offensive against Habsburg possessions in Navarre and Flanders, Francis first secured his position in Italy by agreeing a new alliance with Venice. As Leo X had backed his candidacy for Emperor, he also counted on Papal support but Leo sided with Charles in return for his help against Martin Luther and his proposed reforms to the Catholic church. In November 1521, an Imperial-Papal army under Prospero Colonna and the Marquis of Pescara captured Milan and restored Francesco Sforza as duke. After Leo died in December, Adrian VI was elected Pope on 9 January 1522, while a French attempt to retake Milan was ended by defeat at Bicocca on 27 April.   

In May 1522, England joined the Imperial alliance and declared war on France. Venice left the war in July 1523, while Adrian died in November and was succeeded by Clement VII, who tried to negotiate an end to the fighting without success. Although France had lost ground in Lombardy and been invaded by English, Imperial and Spanish armies, her opponents had differing objectives and failed to co-ordinate their attacks. Since Papal policy was to prevent either France or the Empire from becoming too powerful, in late 1524 Clement secretly allied himself with Francis, enabling him to mount another offensive against Milan. On 24 February 1525, the French army suffered a devastating defeat at Pavia, in which Francis was captured and imprisoned in Spain.    

This led to frantic diplomatic manoeuvres to secure his release, including a French mission to Suleiman the Magnificent, asking for Ottoman assistance. Although Suleiman avoided involvement on this occasion, it was the beginning of a long-standing, if often unacknowledged, Franco-Turkish relationship. Francis was eventually released in March 1526 after signing the Treaty of Madrid, in which he renounced French claims to Artois, Milan and Burgundy.

War of the League of Cognac

Once Francis was free, his Council renounced the Treaty of Madrid, claiming conditions extorted under duress could not be considered binding. Concerned that Imperial power now posed a threat to Papal independence, on 22 May 1526 Clement VII formed the League of Cognac, whose members included France, the Papal States, Venice, Florence and Milan. Many of the Imperial troops were close to mutiny having not been paid for months and the Duke of Urbino, commander of the League army, hoped to take advantage of this confusion. However, he delayed taking the offensive awaiting additional Swiss reinforcements.    

Although the League gained an easy victory on 24 June when the Venetians occupied Lodi, this delay allowed Charles to gather fresh troops and support a Milanese revolt in July against Francesco Sforza, who was once again forced into exile. In September, Charles financed an attack on Rome by the Colonna family, who competed with the rival Orsinis for control of the city, and Clement was forced to pay them to withdraw. Seeking to recapture Milan, Francis invaded Lombardy at the beginning of 1527, with an army financed by Henry VIII, who hoped thereby to win Papal support for divorcing his first wife, Katherine of Aragon. 

In May, Imperial troops, many of whom were followers of Martin Luther, sacked Rome and besieged Clement in the Castel Sant'Angelo, while Urbino and the League army sat outside and failed to intervene. Although the French marched south to relieve Rome, they were too late to prevent Clement making peace with Charles V in November. Meanwhile Venice, the largest and most powerful of the Italian states and which also possessed the most effective army, now refused to contribute any more troops to the League. Weakened by its losses in 1509 to 1517 and with its maritime possessions increasingly threatened by the Ottomans, under Andrea Gritti the Republic tried to remain neutral and after 1529 avoided participation in the fighting. 

Supported by a Genoese fleet, in April 1528 a French expeditionary force besieged Naples before disease forced them to withdraw in August. Both sides were now anxious to end the war and after another French defeat at Landriano on 21 June 1529, Francis agreed the Treaty of Cambrai with Charles in August. Known as the "Peace of the Ladies" because it was negotiated by Francis's mother, Louise of Savoy, and Charles's aunt Margaret, Francis recognised Charles as ruler of Milan, Naples, Flanders and Artois. Venice also made peace, leaving only Florence, which had expelled their Medici rulers in 1527. At Bologna in the summer of 1529, Charles V was named King of Italy; he agreed to restore the Medici on behalf of Pope Clement, who was himself a Medici, and after a lengthy siege, Florence surrendered in August 1530. 

Prior to 1530, interference by foreign powers in Italy was viewed as a short term problem, since they could not sustain it over time; for example, French conquests of Naples in 1494 and 1501 and Milan in 1499 and 1515 were quickly reversed. On the other hand, Venice was generally viewed by other states as the greatest threat because it was an Italian power. Many assumed the primacy established at Bologna by Charles V in Italy would also soon pass but instead it was the start of a long period of Imperial dominance. One factor was Venice's withdrawal from Italian affairs after 1530 in favour of protecting its maritime empire from Ottoman expansion.

Italian War of 1536–1538

Under the Treaty of Cambrai, Francesco Sforza was reinstated as Duke of Milan; since he had no children, it also stated Charles V would inherit the duchy on his death, which occurred on 1 November 1535. Francis refused to accept this, arguing Milan was rightfully his along with Genoa and Asti, and once again prepared for war. In April 1536, pro-Valois elements in Asti expelled the Imperial garrison and a French army under Philippe de Chabot occupied Turin, although they failed to take Milan. 

In response, a Spanish army invaded Provence and captured Aix on 13 August 1536, before withdrawing, a fruitless expedition that diverted resources from Italy, where the situation had become more serious. The 1536 Franco-Ottoman alliance, a comprehensive treaty covering a wide range of commercial and diplomatic issues, also agreed to a joint assault on Genoa, with French land forces supported by an Ottoman fleet. 

Finding the garrison of Genoa had recently been reinforced while a planned internal uprising failed to materialise, the French instead occupied the towns of Pinerolo, Chieri and Carmagnola in Piedmont. Fighting continued in Flanders and northern Italy throughout 1537, while the Ottoman fleet raided the coastal areas around Naples, raising fears of invasion throughout Italy. Pope Paul III, who had replaced Clement in 1534, grew increasingly anxious to end the war and brought the two sides together at Nice in May 1538.  The Truce of Nice, signed on 18 June, agreed a ten year halt in hostilities and left France in possession of most of Savoy, Piedmont and Artois.

Italian War of 1542–1546

The 1538 truce failed to resolve underlying tensions between Francis, who still claimed Milan, and Charles, who insisted he comply with the treaties of Madrid and Cambrai. Their relationship collapsed in 1540 when Charles made his son Philip Duke of Milan, thus precluding any possibility it would revert to France. In 1541, Charles made a disastrous attack on Ottoman port of Algiers, which severely weakened his military and led Suleiman to reactivate his French alliance. With Ottoman support, on 12 July 1542 Francis once again declared war on the Holy Roman Empire, initiating the Italian War of 1542–46. 

In August, French armies attacked Perpignan on the Spanish border, as well as Artois, Flanders and Luxemburg, a Valois possession prior to 1477. Imperial resistance proved far more formidable than expected, with most of these attacks easily repulsed and in 1543 Henry VIII allied with Charles and agreed to support his offensive in Flanders. Neither side made much progress, and although a combined Franco-Ottoman fleet under Hayreddin Barbarossa captured Nice on 22 August and besieged the citadel, the onset of winter and presence of a Spanish fleet forced them to withdraw. A joint attack by Christian and Islamic troops on a Christian town was regarded as shocking, especially when Francis allowed Barbarossa to use the French port of Toulon as a winter base.

On 14 April 1544, a French army commanded by Francis, Count of Enghien, defeated the Imperials at Ceresole, a victory of limited strategic value since they failed to make progress elsewhere in Lombardy. The Imperial position was further strengthened at Serravalle in June, when Alfonso d'Avalos defeated a mercenary force led by the Florentine exile Piero Strozzi on their way to meet Enghien. An English army captured Boulogne on 10 September, while Imperial forces advanced to within  of Paris. However, with his treasury exhausted and concerned by Ottoman naval strength in the Mediterranean Sea, on 14 September Charles agreed the Treaty of Crépy with Francis, which essentially restored the position to that prevailing in 1542. The agreement excluded Henry VIII, whose war with France continued until the two countries made peace in 1546 and confirmed his possession of Boulogne.

Italian War of 1551–1559

Francis died on 31 March 1547 and was succeeded by his son, Henry II of France. He continued attempts to restore the French position in Italy, encouraged by Italian exiles and his cousin Francis, Duke of Guise, who claimed the throne of Naples through his grandfather René II, Duke of Lorraine. Henry first strengthened his diplomatic position by reactivating the Franco-Ottoman alliance and supporting their capture of Tripoli in August 1551. Despite his devout personal Catholicism and persecution of Huguenot "heretics" at home, in January 1552 he signed the Treaty of Chambord with several Protestant princes within the Empire, which gave him control of the Three Bishoprics of Toul, Verdun, and Metz.  

Following the outbreak of the Second Schmalkaldic War in March 1552, French troops occupied the Three Bishoprics and invaded Lorraine. In 1553, a Franco-Ottoman force captured the Genoese island of Corsica, while supported by Henry's wife, Catherine de' Medici, French-backed Tuscan exiles seized control of Siena. This brought Henry into conflict with the ruler of Florence, Cosimo de' Medici, who defeated a French army at Marciano on 2 August 1554; although Siena held out until April 1555, it was absorbed by Florence and in 1569 became part of the Grand Duchy of Tuscany.   

In July 1554, Philip II of Spain became king of England through his marriage to Mary I, and in November he also received the kingdoms of Naples and Sicily from his father, who reconfirmed him as Duke of Milan. In January 1556, Charles formally abdicated as Emperor and split his possessions; the Holy Roman Empire went to his brother Ferdinand I, while Spain, its overseas territories and the Spanish Netherlands were assigned to Philip. Over the next century, Naples and Lombardy became a major source of men and money for the Spanish Army of Flanders during the 1568 to 1648 Eighty Years' War.  

England entered the war in June 1557 and the focus shifted to Flanders, where a Spanish army defeated the French at St. Quentin on 10 August. Despite this, in January 1558 the French took Calais; held by the English since 1347, its loss severely diminished their future ability to intervene directly in mainland Europe. They also captured Thionville in June but peace negotiations had already begun, with Henry absorbed by the internal conflict that led to the French Wars of Religion in 1562. The Treaty of Cateau-Cambrésis on 3 April 1559 brought the Italian wars to an end. Corsica was returned to Genoa, while Emmanuel Philibert, Duke of Savoy, re-established the Savoyard state in northern Italy as an independent entity. France retained Calais and the Three Bishoprics, while other provisions essentially returned the position to that prevailing in 1551. Finally, Henry II and Philip II agreed to ask Pope Pius IV to recognise Ferdinand as Emperor, and reconvene the Council of Trent.

Aftermath

The European balance of power changed significantly during the Italian Wars. The affirmation of French power in Italy around 1494 brought Austria and Spain to join an anti-French league that formed the "Habsburg ring" around France (Low Countries, Aragon, Castile, Empire) via dynastic marriages that eventually led to the large inheritance of Charles V. On the other hand, the last Italian war ended with the division of the Habsburg Empire between the Spanish and Austrian Habsburgs following the abdication of Charles V. Philip II of Spain was heir of the kingdoms held by Charles V in Spain, southern Italy, and South America. Ferdinand I was the successor of Charles V in the Holy Roman Empire extending from Germany to northern Italy and became suo jure king of the Habsburg monarchy. The Habsburg Netherlands and the Duchy of Milan were left in personal union to the king of Spain while continuing to be part of the Holy Roman Empire.

The division of the empire of Charles V, along with the expansion of the French state over the Pas-de-Calais and the Three Bishoprics, was a positive result for France. However, the Habsburgs had gained a position of primacy in Europe and Italy at the expense of the French Valois.  In fact, in order to achieve this defensive objective, France was forced to end opposition to Habsburg power and abandon its claims in Italy. Henry II also restored the Savoyard state to Emmanuel Philibert, who settled in Piedmont, and Corsica to the Republic of Genoa.  For this reason, the conclusion of the Italian Wars for France is considered to be a mixed result.

At the end of the wars, Italy was largely divided between viceroyalties of the Spanish Habsburgs in the south and formal fiefs of the Austrian Habsburgs in the north. The most significant Italian power left was the Papacy in central Italy, as it maintained major cultural and political influence during the Catholic Reformation. The Council of Trent, suspended during the war, was reconvened by the terms of the peace treaties and came to an end in 1563.

Interpretations

As in the case of France, the Habsburg result is also variously interpreted. Many historians in the 20th century, including Garrett Mattingly, Eric Cochrane and Manuel F. Alvarez, identified the Peace of Cateau-Cambrésis as the beginning of Spanish hegemony in Italy. According to that view, the partition of the Habsburg empire at the abdication of Charles V left the position of the Holy Roman Empire in Italy weakened in favour of Spain so that the peace was mostly a victory of the latter. However, in 21st-century historiography there is a reconsideration of the topic. Christine Shaw in her revised Italian Wars (1494-1559), Micheal J. Levin in Agents of Empire, and William Reger in Limits of Empire, reject the concept of a Spanish hegemony on the ground that too many limits prevented Spain's dominance in the peninsula, and maintain that other powers also held major influence in Italy after 1559.

According to Christine Shaw, it was the dual protection of Spain and the Holy Roman Empire that was established in Italy after Cateau-Cambrésis. Among Italian historians, a similar view was held by Salvatore Puglisi (in le prime strette dell'Austria in Italia), who understood the result of the wars as the beginning of both Austrian and Spanish Habsburg power in Italy. According to Angelantonio Spagnoletti in his Principi Italiani e Spagna nell'età barocca, echoing Benedetto Croce in his works on Baroque Italy, the Papacy and Spain emerged as the two main forces in the peninsula after Cateau-Cambrésis. According to their view, the position of the Papacy was strengthened by the conclusion of the council of Trent and the beginning of the counter-reformation. Peter J. Wilson writes that three overlapping and competing feudal networks, Imperial, Spanish, and Papal, were affirmed in Italy as a result of the end of the wars. Terms such as "refeudalization" (rifeudalizzazione) have also been used by Italian authors to describe the political and socio-economic situation of Italy after 1559.

In the long-term, Habsburg primacy in Italy continued to exist, but it varied significantly due to the change of dynasties in Austria and Spain. Following the European wars of succession, the Habsburg-Lorraine of Austria gained direct or indirect control of the fiefs of Imperial Italy, whereas the south passed to a cadet branch of the Spanish Bourbons. France would return in Italy to confront Habsburg power, first under Louis XIV, and later under Napoleon, but only the unification of Italy would permanently remove foreign powers from the peninsula.

Charles Tilly has characterized the Italian Wars as a key part in his theory of state formation, as the wars demonstrated the value of large armies and superior military technology. In Coercion, Capital, and European States, AD 990–1992, Tilly argues that a "comprehensive European state system" can be reasonably dated to the Italian Wars.

Military

The Italian Wars represented a revolution in military technology and tactics, some historians suggesting they form the dividing point between modern and medieval battlefields. Contemporary historian Francesco Guicciardini wrote of the initial 1494 French invasion that "...sudden and violent wars broke out, ending with the conquest of a state in less time than it used to take to occupy a villa. The siege and taking of a city became extremely rapid and achieved not in months but in days and hours". 

Infantry underwent profound developments during the Italian Wars, evolving from a primary pike- and halberd-wielding force to a more flexible arrangement of arquebusiers, pikemen, and other troops. While landsknechts and Swiss mercenaries continued to dominate during the early part of the wars, the Italian War of 1521 demonstrated the power of massed firearms in pike and shot formations.

A 1503 skirmish between French and Spanish forces first demonstrated the utility of arquebuses in battle. The Spanish general, Gonzalo de Córdoba, faked a retreat, luring a contingent of French men-at-arms between two groups of his arquebusiers. As the French army stepped between the marksmen, volleys of bullets battered them on both flanks. Before the French could attack the vulnerable arquebusiers, a Spanish cavalry charge broke the French forces and forced their retreat. While the French army escaped, the Spanish inflicted severe casualties.

So successful was the employment of firearms in the Italian Wars that Niccolò Machiavelli, often characterized as an enemy of the use of the arquebus, wrote in his treatise on The Art of War that all citizens in a city should know how to fire a gun.

Veterans turned conquistadors
Many conquistadors, such as Hernán Cortés, had considered Italy before opting to serve in Spanish America, while large numbers of veterans from Naples and southern Italy later emigrated there, either as colonists or soldiers. Experience in Italy was often considered a prerequisite for military employment, although the chronicler Gonzalo Fernández de Oviedo y Valdés claimed those who did so must have "failed to become rich,...gambled the riches away or [somehow] lost them" and suggested conditions in the Americas were far tougher. Francisco Sebastián, an Italian veteran who accompanied Hernando de Soto on his expedition into North America, agreed with this assessment, largely because "no plunder of value could be obtained" from the inhabitants.

Italian veterans included Diego Velázquez de Cuéllar, who conquered Cuba in 1511, Francisco de Carvajal and Pedro de Valdivia, both of whom fought at Pavia in 1526. Carvajal and Valdivia served with the Pizarro brothers in Peru during their conflict with Spanish rival Diego de Almagro in 1538. Carvajal remained with the Pizarros while Valdivia began the conquest of Chile and ignited the Arauco War. The two men fought on opposite sides in the 1548 Battle of Jaquijahuana; Carvajal was executed after being taken prisoner, while Valdivia died in 1553 at Tucapel.

Cavalry

Heavy cavalry, the final evolution of the fully armoured medieval knight, remained significant players on the battlefields of the Italian Wars. Largely due to their excellent horses, French gendarmes were generally successful against heavy mounted troops from other states, but were very vulnerable to pikemen. The Spanish used heavy cavalry and light cavalry, or Jinetes, for skirmishing.

Artillery
Artillery, particularly field artillery, became an indispensable part of any first-rate army during the wars. When Charles VII invaded in 1494, he brought with him the first truly mobile siege train of culverins and bombards. It included various innovations, such as mounting the guns on wheeled carriages, drawn by horses rather than oxen as was the custom, which allowed them to be deployed against an enemy stronghold on arrival. This mobility stemmed from their lightness, achieved by employing the methods used to cast bronze church bells. Perhaps the most important improvement was the creation of the iron cannonball, rather than the stone balls that often shattered on impact. The combination meant Charles could level in an hour castles that had resisted sieges for months or even years.

Historiography 
The Italian Wars are one of the first major conflicts for which extensive contemporary accounts from people involved in the wars are available, owing largely to the presence of literate, and often extremely-well educated, commanders. The invention of modern printing, still less than one century old, undoubtedly played a large role in the memorialization of the conflict as well. Major historians of the period include Francesco Guicciardini and Paolo Sarpi.

Nomenclature 
The naming of the component conflicts within the Italian Wars has never been standardized and varies among historians of the period. Some wars may be split or combined differently, causing ordinal numbering systems to be inconsistent among different sources. The wars may be referred to by their dates or by the monarchs fighting them. Usually, the Italian Wars are grouped into three major phases: 1494-1516; 1521-1530; and 1535-1559.

Contemporary accounts 
A major contemporary account for the early portion of the Italian Wars is Francesco Guicciardini's Storia d'Italia (History of Italy), written during the conflict and advantaged by the access that Guicciardini had to papal affairs.

Notes

References

Sources
 
 
 
 
 
 
 
 
 
 
 
 
 
 
 
 
 
 
 
 
 
 
 
 
 
 
 Konstam, Angus. Pavia 1525: The Climax of the Italian Wars. Oxford: Osprey Publishing, 1996. .
 
 
 
 
  
 
 
 
 
 Norwich, John Julius. A History of Venice. New York: Vintage Books, 1989. .
 Oman, Charles. A History of the Art of War in the Sixteenth Century. London: Methuen & Co., 1937.
 
 
 Phillips, Charles and Alan Axelrod. Encyclopedia of Wars. 3 vols. New York: Facts on File, 2005. .

Further reading 

 Le Gall, Jean-Marie, Les guerres d'Italie (1494–1559): une lecture religieuse. Geneva: Droz, 2017.
 Boot, Max. War Made New: Technology, Warfare, and the Course of History: 1500 to Today. New York: Gotham Books, 2006. .
 Du Bellay, Martin, Sieur de Langey. Mémoires de Martin et Guillaume du Bellay. Edited by V. L. Bourrilly and F. Vindry. 4 volumes. Paris: Société de l'histoire de France, 1908–19.
 Giovio, Paolo. Pauli Iovii Opera. Volume 3, part 1, Historiarum sui temporis. Edited by D. Visconti. Rome: Libreria dello Stato, 1957.
 Lot, Ferdinand. Recherches sur les effectifs des armées françaises des guerres d'Italie aux guerres de religion, 1494–1562. Paris: École Pratique des Hautes Études, 1962.
 Monluc, Blaise de. Commentaires. Edited by P. Courteault. 3 volumes. Paris: 1911–25. Translated by Charles Cotton as The Commentaries of Messire Blaize de Montluc (London: A. Clark, 1674).
 Monluc, Blaise de. Military Memoirs: Blaise de Monluc, The Habsburg-Valois Wars, and the French Wars of Religion. Edited by Ian Roy. London: Longmans, 1971.
 Saulx, Gaspard de, Seigneur de Tavanes. Mémoires de très noble et très illustre Gaspard de Saulx, seigneur de Tavanes, Mareschal de France, admiral des mers de Levant, Gouverneur de Provence, conseiller du Roy, et capitaine de cent hommes d'armes. Château de Lugny: Fourny, 1653.

 
Wars involving the states and peoples of Europe
15th century in France
16th century in France
15th century in Italy
16th century in Italy
15th-century military history of France
16th-century military history of France